Matchabelli or Matchabeli may refer to: 

 Machabeli, a Georgian princely house of nobility
 Ivane Machabeli, a Georgian writer
 Georges V. Matchabelli, Georgian nobleman and co-founder of the perfume line
 Norina Matchabelli, Italian actress and co-founder of Prince Matchabelli perfume line, wife of Georges V. Matchabelli

See also
 Prince Matchabelli, an American perfume line by Georges V. Matchabelli